Calliostoma splendens is a species of sea snail, a marine gastropod mollusk in the family Calliostomatidae.

Description
The height of the solid, imperforate shell reaches 20 cl. The shell has a conical shape. It is rounded at the periphery, its base is flattened. It is dark chestnut colored. The spiral riblets are lighter, the apex is dark, usually purple. The surface is encircled by numerous spiral smooth riblets, their interstices closely finely obliquely striate. The riblets usually number 7 to 9 on the penultimate whorl, about 9 on the base. The spire is conic, the apex acute. The sutures are impressed. The 7 whorls are convex, the last one rounded (or a trifle angled) around the lower part, slightly convex beneath. The rounded aperture is oblique. The outer lip is fluted w'thin, with a beveled opaque white submargin. The throat is pearly and iridescent. The simple columella is arcuate.

Dr. Dall says : this species passes through a number of variations, which, however, do not obscure the specific characters. The ribs are usually yellowish, smooth with reddish-brown interspaces. The apex is blue when eroded. The whole sometimes has a more or less olivaceous cast. The yellow of the apical ribs is usually interrupted by patches of brown. This is sometimes continued on the lower whorls, when the three ribs nearest the suture and often one or two on the carina of the whorls are prettily painted with alternate patches of dark brown and greenish-white. The ribs are more or less prominent, some specimens having them quite sharp
while in others they are hardly raised. In one other exquisite variety the three sutural ribs and their interspaces are of a very rich purple-blue, which is not due to erosion. The umbilical rib is sometimes salmon-colored. The nacre is of great brilliancy.

Distribution
This species occurs abundantly in the Pacific Ocean from Monterey to San Diego, California.

References

External links
 To Biodiversity Heritage Library (25 publications)
 To USNM Invertebrate Zoology Mollusca Collection
 To ITIS
 To World Register of Marine Species

splendens
Gastropods described in 1864